AFC Nové Mesto nad Váhom is a Slovak football team, based in the town of Nové Mesto nad Váhom. The club was founded in 1922.

Notable players
The following players had international caps for their respective countries. Players whose name is listed in bold represented their countries while playing for Slovan.
Past (and present) players who are the subjects of Wikipedia articles can be found here.
 Alias Lembakoali

External links 

Official club website
AFC on Nové Mesto nad Váhom portal

Nove Mesto nad Vahom
Association football clubs established in 1922
1922 establishments in Slovakia